For rugby competitions see:
List of rugby union competitions
List of rugby league competitions